Charles Douglas Cline (March 22, 1938 – October 10, 1995) was a professional American football player who played linebacker for seven seasons for the Houston Oilers and the San Diego Chargers of the American Football League (AFL).

Career
Cline played in 95 career games, all but two with the Oilers. He rushed for 105 yards on 37 carries for 2 touchdowns and caught 4 passes for 15 yards in his first season, the only one where he was used on offense. He had 7 interceptions for 77 return yards while causing 2 fumbles. In the 1961 AFL title game, he had an interception. He returned 4 kick returns for 66 total yards during his career. He was named to the 2nd All-AFL Team in 1962 by the Associated Press and UPI and in 1963 by the Associated Press, NY Daily News and UPI.

References

1938 births
People from Valdese, North Carolina
Players of American football from North Carolina
American football linebackers
Clemson Tigers football players
Houston Oilers players
San Diego Chargers players
1995 deaths